Root Road Bridge is a covered bridge spanning the west branch of the Ashtabula River in Monroe Township, Ashtabula County, Ohio, United States. The bridge, one of currently 16 drivable bridges in the county, is a single span Town truss design. During its renovation in 1982-83, the bridge was raised , and a new center pier was added.

History
1868 – Bridge constructed.
1982-83 – Bridge renovated.
A former toll road just east of there ran north and south through the county. Dwight and Gertrude (Hallam) Root, had a son Herbert Root. Herbert married Frances Whitlam, daughter of John H. Whitlam, one if not the first Superintendent of Roads in Ashtabula County, for twenty five years. He possibly was involved in the construction of the earlier bridges.

Dimensions
Span: 
Length: 
Width: 
Height: 
Overhead clearance:

Gallery

See also
List of Ashtabula County covered bridges

References

External links
Ohio Covered Bridges List
Ohio Covered Bridge Homepage
The Covered Bridge Numbering System
Ohio Historic Bridge Association
Root Road Covered Bridge from Ohio Covered Bridges, Historic Bridges

Covered bridges in Ashtabula County, Ohio
Bridges completed in 1868
Road bridges in Ohio
Wooden bridges in Ohio
Lattice truss bridges in the United States